St. Sunniva School (St. Sunniva skole) is an independent Roman Catholic school located in the centre of Oslo, Norway.

The school was founded by the Sisters of St. Joseph from  Chambéry in the Rhône-Alpes region in south-eastern France. Founded in 1865, it was part of an effort to restore Roman Catholicism in Norway. Queen Josephine,  consort of Sweden and Norway, was an ardent supporter of the school. Her sister Queen Amélie,  Empress of Brazil, also provided support.

The school was owned and operated by the Sisters of St. Joseph for 140 years. Since 1 August 2005, it has been owned and operated by the Catholic Diocese of Oslo (Oslo Katolske Bispedømme). The school averages 540 students between the first and tenth grade.

References

External links
St. Sunniva skole website

Schools in Oslo
Secondary schools in Norway
School buildings completed in 1865
Educational institutions established in 1865
1865 establishments in Norway
Catholic secondary schools in Europe
Sisters of Saint Joseph schools
Catholicism in Norway
Christian schools in Norway